Tam Bình is a rural district of Vĩnh Long province, in the Mekong Delta region of Vietnam. The district covers an area of 280 km². The district capital lies at Tam Bình.

References

Districts of Vĩnh Long province